The White House Office of the Executive Clerk is responsible for managing the original legal documents signed by the President of the United States which make up his official acts—these include public laws, vetoes, treaties, executive orders, signing statements, nominations, proclamations, commissions, pardons, and certificates of awards or medals.  The office is further responsible for delivering any reports or messages the President wishes to send to the United States Congress.  Formed in 1865, it is one of the oldest offices in the Executive Office of the President of the United States.

Organization
The Office of the Executive Clerk is currently housed within the larger White House Office of the Staff Secretary, which controls the general paper flow through the President's office.

Unlike most components of the White House Office—where the staff are nearly all political appointees of the incumbent President—the Office of the Executive Clerk is staffed entirely by career civil servants.  Also unique within the White House, the Executive Clerk retains many of its records from one administration to the next, rather than packing up all documents and data and delivering them to the National Archives and Records Administration as other White House offices are required to do under the Presidential Records Act.  Since the founding of the office in 1865, there have been only 11 executive clerks—an average term of over 13 years per executive clerk.  The current White House Executive Clerk, since 2012, is career civil servant Dave Kalbaugh.  Kalbaugh has served in the Office of the Executive Clerk for 29 years, serving four presidents.

History
Before the establishment of the White House Staff Secretary in 1953, the Executive Clerk oversaw a much broader range of White House functions, including White House finances, the messenger service, the mail room, presidential correspondence, and records management.

Executive clerks
Partial table of former White House executive clerks:

References

External links
 WhiteHouse.gov

Executive Office of the President of the United States
Government agencies established in 1865